Kerem Öktem (born 1969) is a Turkish political scientist and professor at the Università Ca' Foscari in Italy. Between 2014 and 2019 he worked as a professor at the University of Graz.  In a 2013 interview Öktem stated that his field of research was:

References

References

Academic staff of the University of Graz
21st-century Turkish historians
Contemporary historians
1969 births
Living people